Eugene Ronald Hiscock (born June 27, 1950) was a Canadian politician. He represented the electoral district of Eagle River in the Newfoundland and Labrador House of Assembly from 1979 to 1989. He was a member of the Liberal Party. He was born at Chamberlains, Newfoundland.

References

1950 births
Living people
Liberal Party of Newfoundland and Labrador MHAs
People from Conception Bay South